The Core Sound 20 Mark 3 is an American sailboat that was designed by B&B Yacht Designs for cruising and first built in 2014. The boat is supplied as a series of kits and plans for amateur construction.

The Core Sound 20 Mark 3 is a development of the Core Sound 20 and is named for the North Carolinian body of water.

Production
The design's kits are supplied by B&B Yacht Designs of Bayboro, North Carolina, United States. The kit includes pre-cut wooden components, cut with a CNC machine. There are individual kits for the hull, portals, centerboard and rudder, masts, sails, rigging and lines, epoxy and fiberglass. Additional wood is required for hull stringers and other parts to complete the boat.

Design

The Core Sound 20 Mark 3 is a recreational keelboat, built predominantly of stitch and glue  okume wood, with two unstayed aluminum masts. It has a loose-footed cat ketch rig with wishbone booms, a slightly raked stem, a plumb transom, a transom-hung rudder controlled by a tiller, a self-draining cockpit and a retractable centerboard keel. It displaces  and carries  of lead ballast in the centerboard tip. The centerboard is of wood, covered with glass cloth and epoxy. It also has a  flooding water ballast tank, which is drained for road transport.

In 2018, the original design was modified to add a mizzen mast tabernacle to allow easier rigging, as well as greater cabin headroom and simplified construction. The design has provisions for a portable style head.

The boat is normally fitted with a small outboard motor for docking and maneuvering.

See also

List of sailing boat types

Similar sailboats
Buccaneer 220
Cal 20
Flicka 20
Halman 20
Hunter 20
Mistral T-21
Paceship 20
San Juan 21
Sirius 22 
West Wight Potter 19

References

External links

Keelboats
2010s sailboat type designs
Sailing yachts
Sailboat type designs by B&B Yacht Designs
Sailboat types built by B&B Yacht Designs